Nuwar may refer to:
 Storm Worm, malicious computer code
 Nuwar, Iran, a village in Hamadan Province, Iran